The Motive (Hebrew: המניע) is a four-part Israeli docuseries that explores the 1986 killings of four family members by a 14-year-old boy in Jerusalem. It was created by Tali Shemesh and Asaf Sudri. The series includes reconstructions of the original events featuring actors. It was broadcast in Israel on the Yes Docu channel in December 2020, and released on Netflix on 28 October 2021.

References

External links
 
 

Netflix original documentary television series
Israeli television shows
Hebrew-language Netflix original programming
True crime television series